Kuppa (Dargwa: Къуппа) is a rural locality (a selo) and the administrative centre of Kuppinsky Selsoviet, Levashinsky District, Republic of Dagestan, Russia. The population was 1,462 as of 2010. There are 10 streets.

Geography 
Kuppa is located 22 km west of Levashi (the district's administrative centre) by road. Kundurkhe and Irgali are the nearest rural localities.

Nationalities 
Dargins live there.

Famous residents 
 Ziyautdin-Kadi (writer)
 I. Omarov (writer)

References 

Rural localities in Levashinsky District